Dirleton railway station was a railway station on the North Berwick Branch of the North British Railway in East Lothian, Scotland. It was an intermediate station on the branch line from Drem.

History

Dirleton station was a small station with a single platform and two sidings on the south side of the line.  There was no signalbox, and the siding points were controlled by a ground frame.

Dirleton station closed to passengers on 1 February 1954, with the goods yard surviving as an unstaffed public siding until 1 June 1959.  The station house is now privately owned, and the station site is clearly visible from passing trains.

Although named for the village of Dirleton, the station was actually some distance away, approximately halfway between Dirleton and Kingston.  A plan to give Direlton a more convenient station was put forward by the Aberlady, Gullane and North Berwick Railway, which was founded in 1893.  This company opened its line from Spittal (Aberlady Junction) near Longniddry to Gullane in 1898, but plans to extend it to join the North Berwick branch near Williamstown were never implemented.

Previous services

Sources 
 
 Hajducki, Andrew M. (1992) The North Berwick and Gullane Branch Lines, Headington, Oakwood Press,

External links
 RAILSCOT on the North Berwick Branch

Former North British Railway stations
Railway stations in Great Britain opened in 1850
Railway stations in Great Britain closed in 1954
Disused railway stations in East Lothian
1850 establishments in Scotland
1954 disestablishments in Scotland